Geologica Acta is a peer-reviewed open-access scientific journal that covers research in the Earth sciences. It was established in 2003 as a successor to Acta Geológica Hispánica (1966-2002), a locally oriented journal published in Spanish. The journal is published by the University of Barcelona, the Instituto de Ciencias de la Tierra Jaume Almera (CSIC), the Institut de Diagnosi Ambiental i Estudis de l'Aigua (CSIC), and the Autonomous University of Barcelona.

Abstracting and indexing
The journal is abstracted and indexed in:

According to the Journal Citation Reports, the journal has a 2017 impact factor of 0.692.

References

External links

Publications established in 2003
English-language journals
Geology journals
Quarterly journals
Spanish-language journals